Ernst Albrecht (12 November 1907 – 26 March 1976) was a German footballer. He was part of Germany's team for the 1928 Summer Olympics.

Career 
He played for Fortuna Düsseldorf in the team that won the 1933 German football championship.

Between 1928 and 1934, Albrecht appeared 17 times for the Germany national team, scoring four goals. Though he did not participate in the tournament, he was part of the German team which came third in the 1934 FIFA World Cup in Italy.

International goals

References

External links
 
 
 
 

1907 births
1976 deaths
Footballers from Düsseldorf
German footballers
Germany international footballers
Fortuna Düsseldorf players
Olympic footballers of Germany
Footballers at the 1928 Summer Olympics
1934 FIFA World Cup players
Association football midfielders
20th-century German people